Banastre Maynard, 3rd Baron Maynard (c. 1642 – 3 March 1718)  was an English politician who sat in the House of Commons from 1663 to 1679. He succeeded to the peerage as Baron Maynard in 1699.

Life
Maynard was the second eldest son of William Maynard, 2nd Baron Maynard of Estaines and his first wife Dorothy Banastre, daughter of Sir Robert Banastre of Passenham, Northamptonshire. He travelled abroad in France, Italy, Germany and the Netherlands from 1660 to 1662. In 1663 he was elected Member of Parliament for Essex in a by-election to the Cavalier Parliament. He was commissioner for assessment for Essex from 1663 to 1680 and commissioner for recusants in 1675. He was a J.P. from April 1688 to his death and was commissioner for assessment for Essex again from 1689 to 1690. He succeeded to the peerage as Baron Maynard on the death of his father on 3 February 1699.

Family
Maynard married Lady Elizabeth Grey, daughter of Henry Grey, 10th Earl of Kent and had eight sons and three daughters. Their children included:
Henry Maynard, 4th Baron Maynard (c. 1673–1742)
Grey Maynard, 5th Baron Maynard (1679–1745)
Charles Maynard, 1st Viscount Maynard (c. 1690–1775)
Annabella Maynard (d. 1734) who married Sir William Lowther, 1st Baronet

References

1642 births
1718 deaths
3
Maynard, Banaste
Barons in the Peerage of Ireland